Cherik may refer to:
 Cherik, Iran
 Cherik, Kyrgyzstan